Chu Đình Nghiêm is a Vietnamese professional football manager and former player who manages V.League 1 club Haiphong.

Honours

Manager
Hà Nội
V.League 1: 2016, 2018, 2019
Vietnamese National Cup: 2019, 2020
Vietnamese Super Cup: 2018, 2019, 2020

References

Living people
Hanoi FC managers
Vietnamese footballers
Vietnamese football managers
Association footballers not categorized by position
1972 births